Pippo Psaila (born as Philip Psaila on June 2, 1957, Malta), was the Malta national football team coach between 1991 and 1992, and was the Director of Sports of the Malta Olympic Committee.

Politics
Psaila will contest his first general elections in the interests of the Partit Nazzjonalista over the ninth and tenth political districts of Malta

References

1957 births
Living people
Malta national football team managers
Maltese football managers